A burial society is a type of benefit/friendly society. These groups historically existed in England and elsewhere, and were constituted for the purpose of providing by voluntary subscriptions for the funeral expenses of the husband, wife or child of a member, or of the widow of a deceased member.  Some also allowed for insuring money to be paid on the death of a member.

Not-for-profit burial societies still exist today. For-profit companies also provide funeral insurance.

Jewish communities often include a burial society known as the chevra kadisha, which also covers performing the necessary Jewish funerary rituals and ceremonies.

In antiquity
Burial society is a precursor to general insurance which is a recent innovation. Burial societies were first known to exist in ancient Rome and not before. In ancient Rome, various associations of a fraternal nature, as well as religious groups, political clubs, and trade guilds, functioned as burial societies. Terms for these include hetaeria, collegium, and sodalitas. The by-laws of one burial society are preserved by an inscription dating to A.D. 136. Discovered at Lanuvium, the lex collegia salutaris Dianae et Antinoi ("By-laws of the Society of Diana and Antinous") details the cost of joining the society, monthly fees, regulations for the burial of members, and the schedule for the group's meetings and dinners. Another example at Rome was the College of Aesculapius and Hygia, founded by a wealthy woman in honor of her dead husband. Inscriptional evidence exists for burial societies throughout the Empire, not just in the city of Rome.

One of the ways that the Romans made sense of the earliest Christian groups was to think of them as associations of this kind, particularly burial societies, which were permitted even when political conflict or civil unrest caused authorities to ban meetings of other groups; Pliny identified Christians collectively as a hetaeria.

19th century

Edmund Roberts mentioned the European and Burial Society when he visited Cape Town, South Africa in 1833. The society was founded in 1795 by Dutch settlers. He described it as "supporting poor and unfortunate fellow-countrymen, during their illness, and in the event of their death, to cause them to be respectfully interred". He also mentioned that the society had "considerable funds", during his visit to the area.

References

External links
End of Empire
Funeral Consumers Alliance

 Burial